Rawdon Gold Mines is a community in the Canadian province of Nova Scotia, located in the Municipal District of East Hants .  See Rawdon, Nova Scotia.

References
 Rawdon Gold Mines on Destination Nova Scotia

Communities in Hants County, Nova Scotia
General Service Areas in Nova Scotia